Niels Hansen (7 November 1924 – 4 January 2015) was the German ambassador to Israel and the author of Out of the Shadows of the Catastrophe.

References

http://www.mfa.gov.il/MFA/Israel+beyond+politics/22nd%20Jerusalem%20Book%20Fair%20opens%20February%2013%202-Feb-2005

1924 births
2015 deaths
Knights Commander of the Order of Merit of the Federal Republic of Germany
Permanent Representatives of West Germany to NATO
German expatriates in Israel